The 1956 Copa del Generalísimo Juvenil was the sixth staging of the tournament. The competition began on May 6, 1956, and ended on June 24, 1956, with the final.

First round

|}

Replay Games

|}

Second round

|}

Replay Game

|}

Third round

|}

Replay Game

|}

Quarterfinals

|}

Replay Games

|}

Semifinals

|}

Final

|}

Copa del Rey Juvenil de Fútbol
Juvenil